The Bruneau Episcopal Church is a historic church located off State Highway 51 on the south side of Bruneau in Owyhee County, Idaho.

It is a shiplap-sided frame building with an outset gable-roofed porch/belfry.  It was designed by Tourtellotte & Hummel. Gothic-style is alluded to by lancet-type windows.

References

Churches on the National Register of Historic Places in Idaho
Churches completed in 1911
Owyhee County, Idaho
Tourtellotte & Hummel buildings